The 20 Años Tour was a concert tour performed by Luis Miguel during the years 1990 and 1991 to promote his last album 20 Años. On this tour he performed more than 10 sold-out concerts at the Centro de Espectáculos Premier in Mexico City, that season of concerts was recorded to later launch a VHS Video called Luis Miguel: 20 Años.

Set list 
This set list is representative of the shows in Centro de Espectáculos Premier. It does not represent all dates throughout the tour.

 "Introduction" 
 "Oro De Ley"
 "Yo Que No Vivo Sin Ti"
 "Amante del Amor"
 "Pupilas de Gato" 
 "Culpable o No"
 "Hoy El Aire Huele a Ti"
 "Más Allá de Todo"
 "Ahora Te Puedes Marchar"
 "Il Cielo" (in Italian)
 "Alguien Como Tú"
 "Entrégate"
 "Fría Como el Viento"
 "Strana Gelosia" (in Italian)
 "Tengo Todo Excepto a Ti"
 "Interlude" (Band)
 "Será Que No Me Amas"
 Trio Medley (with the trio "Los Pao"): 
"Un Poco Más" 
"Llévatela"
"El Reloj"  
"Sabor a Mí"
"Contigo Aprendí"
 "De Que Manera Te Olvido" (with the trio "Los Pao") 
 "Como Fue" (with the trio "Los Pao") 
 "Un Hombre Busca Una Mujer" 
 "La Incondicional" 
 "Cuando Calienta El Sol"

Tour dates

Note: A lot of dates and venues are missing, and others may be wrong, due to the lack of reliable sources.

Band 
Vocals: Luis Miguel
Musical Director: Juan Carlos Toribio
Acoustic & electric guitar: Kiko Cibrian
Bass: Rudy Machorro
Piano & Keyboards: Juan Carlos Toribio
Keyboards: Arturo Pérez
Drums: Fernando Caballero
Percussion & Chorus: Alfredo Algarin
Saxophone: 
Trumpet: Juan Manuel Arpero
Trumpet: José Villar
Backing Vocals: Patricia Tanus
Trio: Los Pao

Notes

References

Luis Miguel concert tours
1990 concert tours
1991 concert tours